"Efecto" (English: "Effect") is a song by Puerto Rican rapper Bad Bunny from his fifth studio album Un Verano Sin Ti (2022). The song was written by Benito Martínez and its production was handled by MAG, La Paciencia and Bass Charity.

Promotion and release
On May 2, 2022, Bad Bunny announced his fifth studio album, Un Verano Sin Ti, on which "Efecto" is placed at number ten on the track list. On May 6, 2022, the song was released alongside the rest of Un Verano Sin Ti through Rimas Entertainment.

Commercial performance
Along with the rest of the tracks from Un Verano Sin Ti, "Efecto" charted on the Billboard Hot 100, peaking at number 34. It also performed well on the Billboard Global 200 along with the other album tracks, charting at number 7. On the US Hot Latin Songs chart, the track peaked at number 4.

Audio visualizer
A 360° audio visualizer for the song was uploaded to YouTube on May 6, 2022 along with the other audio visualizer videos of the songs that appeared on Un Verano Sin Ti.

Charts

Weekly charts

Year-end charts

Certifications

References

External links
 

2022 songs
Bad Bunny songs
Songs written by Bad Bunny